Venkataiah Srinivas Prasad (b 1947), better known by name V. Srinivas Prasad, is an Indian politician from the state of Karnataka. He was a member of the Karnataka Legislative Assembly representing the Nanjangud constituency and six-time member of the Lok Sabha from Chamarajanagar (Lok Sabha constituency).

Political party
He was originally from the Indian National Congress. Later he joined Janata Dal - United.Then he went back to Congress and was elected MLA from Nanjangud in 2013. He then changed his party again and officially joined BJP on 24 December 2016. This necessitated a by-poll in Nanjangud which he lost to the Congress candidate in 2017.

Ministry
He was the Minister for Revenue & Muzrai in the Siddaramaiah led Karnataka Government from 2013 to 2016.
He was the Minister for Food and Consumer Affairs in  the Atal Bihari Vajapayee led Indian Government 1999–2004 as a member of Janata Dal - United.

External links 
 Karnataka Legislative Assembly

References 

Living people
Samata Party politicians
Indian National Congress politicians from Karnataka
Bharatiya Janata Party politicians from Karnataka
Janata Dal (Secular) politicians
India MPs 1980–1984
India MPs 1984–1989
India MPs 1989–1991
India MPs 1991–1996
India MPs 1999–2004
Lok Sabha members from Karnataka
India MPs 2019–present
1949 births
Janata Party politicians
Janata Dal (United) politicians
Karnataka MLAs 1999–2004
Karnataka MLAs 2013–2018